The Czech Republic national under-17 football team is the national under-17 football team of the Czech Republic and is governed by the Football Association of the Czech Republic. The team competes in the UEFA European Under-17 Championship, held every year. As of June 2011, their biggest achievement is second place in the 2000 UEFA European Under-16 Championship and the 2006 UEFA European Under-17 Championship.

Competitive record

FIFA U-17 World Cup

*Draws include knockout matches decided by penalty shoot-out.
**Gold background colour indicates that the tournament was won. Red border colour indicates tournament was held on home soil.

UEFA European Under-16 and Under-17 Football Championship

Under-16 era

*Draws include knockout matches decided by penalty shoot-out.
**Gold background colour indicates that the tournament was won. Red border colour indicates tournament was held on home soil.

Under-17 era

*Draws include knockout matches decided by penalty shoot-out.
**Gold background colour indicates that the tournament was won. Red border colour indicates tournament was held on home soil.

Players

Leading Appearances

Note: Players in bold are still eligible to play for the team at the moment.

Statistics correct at 10 March 2013.

Leading Goalscorers

Note: Players in bold are still eligible to play for the team at the moment.

Statistics correct at 10 March 2013.

Current squad
 The following players were called up for the 2023 UEFA European Under-17 Championship qualification matches.
 Match dates: 19–25 October 2022
 Opposition: ,  and Caps and goals correct as of:''' 25 September 2022, after the match against

See also 
 Czech Republic men's national football team
 Czech Republic men's national under-21 football team
 Czech Republic men's national under-19 football team
 Czech Republic men's national under-18 football team
 Czech Republic women's national football team
 Czech Republic women's national under-19 football team
 Czech Republic women's national under-17 football team

References

under-17
European national under-17 association football teams
Youth football in the Czech Republic